Sergey Ivanovich Kozlov (born 7 November 1963) is a politician from the Donbas region, who serves as Prime Minister of the partially-recognised Lugansk People's Republic (LPR) since 2015.

He is a major general in the pro-Russian People's Militia of Donbas. He joined the militia to counter the 2014 Ukrainian Revolution, followed by the LPR's declaration of independence, which he supported. Prior to his defection, he served in Ukraine's State Emergency Service.

Biography
Prior to his appointment, he held the position of the vice-commander of the 2nd Army Corps of the Republic.

In 1981, Kozlov enrolled in the Voroshilovgrad Higher Military Aviation School of Navigators.

From 1994 to 2005, Kozlov served in the State Emergency Service of Ukraine.

Following the establishment of the LPR in 2014, Kozlov was appointed vice-commander of its 2nd Army Corps.

Notes

References

1963 births
Living people
People from Krasnodon
Ukrainian defectors
Ukrainian Air Force officers
Ukrainian State Emergency Service personnel
Pro-Russian people of the war in Donbas
Ukrainian collaborators with Russia
People of the Luhansk People's Republic